Elliston is a small coastal town in the Australian state of South Australia on the west coast of Eyre Peninsula 169 km northwest of Port Lincoln and 641 km west of Adelaide. The township is located on Waterloo Bay. At the 2006 census, Elliston had a population of 377.

History
The first inhabitants of the land that is now Elliston were the Nauo.

The first recorded exploration of the adjacent coastline was by Matthew Flinders in the vessel  from 10–13 February 1802. He named the offshore islands but did not note the presence of Waterloo Bay in his log.

Edward John Eyre explored the area on land in 1840 and 1841 on a journey to Western Australia from Port Lincoln. Originally named Waterloo Bay, the township was later named by Governor Sir William Jervois on a plan for the town on 23 November 1878. It is named after the writer and educator Ellen Liston who was born in London in 1838 and emigrated to South Australia in 1850. She was a governess working on a local property (Nilkerloo) owned by John Hamp.

Those dismissive of women's contributions to history have suggested that Jervois, who had a military background, chose to honor Sir Henry Walton Ellis (1783–1815) who was a hero of the Battle of Waterloo during which campaign he died of his wounds. However it is recorded that Jervois liked naming places after people he knew and the town was gazetted formally as Elliston in 1878 after being informally called Ellie's Town. The Sydney Morning Herald write of the town's naming after Ellen Liston: 

"The honour was a combination of the wide spread respect and admiration she enjoyed in the area and Jervois' penchant for naming towns after friends and family."
[Ref=
https://www.smh.com.au/lifestyle/elliston-20040208-gdkqis.html ]

The area was settled in the 1840s with Elliston being the central port from which the early settlers transported their wool and wheat to market. Sailing ships and later steam ships crossed Waterloo Bay's notorious reefed entrance. A number of ships foundered in the bay due to its narrow entrance and variable tides.

The Nauo people were hit extremely hard by the effects of European settlement. There was a very great deal of violence against Aboriginal people in this area (and a good deal of violence against white settlers also). The Waterloo Bay Massacre of 1869 (also known as the Elliston Massacre) occurred close to Elliston, and there are also many better-documented murders and other violent acts towards Aboriginal people in this area.

Geography

The town of Elliston lies on Waterloo Bay, a small coastal inlet which is partially protected by a number of reefs lining the entrance to the bay. Outside of the bay, the coastline is exclusively large cliffs, with a number of surf beaches located on these stretches.

Inside the bay, it is relatively calm and shallow, with seagrass beds and reefs underwater, and sandy beaches lining most of the bay. Inland, the country is mostly flat agricultural land.  The southern end of the Lake Newland Conservation Park lies about 10 km to the north of the town.

Climate

Eliston experiences a warm-summer mediterranean climate  bordering on the hot-summer subtype (Köppen: Csb/Csa, Trewartha: Csbl);  with warm, dry summers; mild to warm, relatively dry springs and autumns; and mild, moderately rainy winters. Winters are generally mild with cool to cold mornings and frequent showers, although occasionally low pressure systems or northwest cloudbands will provide more persistent rainfall.

Economy

Agriculture, fishing and tourism make up Elliston's economy. Barley and wheat farming take place alongside sheep grazing on the adjacent farmland. Marine activities include abalone diving, lobster and scale fisheries.

The area is a tourist destination, the town having two caravan parks as well as motel and hotel accommodation. Fishing, swimming and other water based activities are common in the protected bay.

Surfing is possible at stretches along the coast, but high numbers of sharks make it risky. Many surf beaches are known for catches of salmon, mulloway and shark as well, with Lock's Well one of the more established beaches.

Community
In the 2006 Australian Bureau of Statistics Census of Population and Housing, the population of the Elliston town census area was 377 people. Males outnumbered females. 92.8% of the population was born in Australia, with immigrants coming from England, Thailand, France, Germany, Papua New Guinea and the Republic of Korea.

Christianity is the most followed religion in the town with 51% of the town following the religion. The major denominations in the town are the Anglican, Catholic and One Heart Uniting Church churches. 29% of the town had no religious beliefs.

The town has a number of sporting clubs and facilities, as well as churches, a hotel, and many local businesses, such as a bakery, a hair salon, and more.

Former Port Adelaide Power footballer Cameron Hitchcock is from Elliston.

Historic buildings

The hall, which was officially opened on 10 February 1968, is distinguished by its mural which was painted with the help of local community members under the direction of artists Siv Grava and John Turpie. According to the placard erected by the District Council of Elliston, it is the largest mural of its type in Australia, depicts the historical life of Elliston and covers more than 500 square meters in area.

The first District Council of Elliston Council Chambers were built in 1913 and still stand adjacent to Waterloo Bay Caravan Park.

The Country Women's Association Rooms were the first to be built in South Australia by that organisation and opened on 4 July 1936.

The Post Office was opened on 13 August 1880 and is the oldest public building still in use. The first Police Station (which still stands) was opened in 1881 and continued to be in use until 1971.

Heritage listings

Elliston has a number of heritage-listed sites, including:

 Flinders Highway: Oaklands Shearing Shed
 off Flinders Highway: Elliston Cast Iron Lead Light
 off Flinders Highway: Elliston Jetty
 9 Memorial Drive: Elliston Country Women's Association Rest Rooms

See also
Elliston (disambiguation)

References

Further reading

External links

Elliston Community Information Centre
District Council of Elliston

Coastal towns in South Australia
Eyre Peninsula
Populated places established in the 1840s